Henry Browning (died c. 1411), of Hythe, Kent, was an English politician.

Family
Browning married a woman named Christine, who outlived him. They had one known child, Margery. Margery married John Smallwode at some point before 1414, who in 1397 had allegedly plotted her father's death.

Career
He was a Member (MP) of the Parliament of England for Hythe in 1368, 1372, 1378, May 1382, February 1383, 1385, 1386, January 1390 and 1391.

References

14th-century births
1411 deaths
English MPs 1368
English MPs 1372
English MPs 1378
English MPs May 1382
English MPs February 1383
English MPs 1385
English MPs 1386
English MPs January 1390
English MPs 1391
14th-century English politicians
People from Hythe, Kent